The women's 3000 metres steeplechase at the 2007 All-Africa Games were held on July 20. This was the first time that this event was held at the All-Africa Games.

Results

References
Results

3000